An Economic and Social History of Europe is a two-volume book by Robert Aldrich and Frank Tipton. The first volume deals with the period 1890-1939 and the second from 1939 to the present.

Reception
The book has been reviewed by Robert R. Locke, Theodore H. Von Laue, Alan Milward and Paul B. Huber.

References

External links 
 An Economic and Social History of Europe 1890-1939
 An Economic and Social History of Europe from 1939 to the Present

1987 non-fiction books
English-language books
Books about economic history
20th-century history books
Economic history of Europe
Johns Hopkins University Press books
Social history of Europe
Books about social history